Lobo is the seventh album by Lobo and his only album on MCA Records, released in 1979.

The album failed to chart. "Where Were You When I Was Falling in Love" peaked at No. 23 on the Billboard Hot 100, becoming his final Top 40 hit to date. It also became his final No. 1 on the Adult Contemporary chart.

Track listing

Personnel
Lobo – guitar, lead vocals
Bob Ray – bass
Mike Leech – bass
Roger Clark – drums
Ken Bell – guitar
Larry Byrom – guitar
Steve Nathan – keyboards
Larry Keith, Lea Jane Berinati, Lisa Silver, Steve Pippin, Van Stephenson – backing vocals
Ron Oates - string arrangements

Production
Producer: Bob Montgomery
Engineers: Don Dailey, Ernie Winfrey, Harold Lee, Travis Turk
Photography: Paul Baker

Charts
Singles

References

External links

1979 albums
MCA Records albums
Lobo (musician) albums
Albums produced by Bob Montgomery (songwriter)